This is a list of regions of Kuwait by Human Development Index as of 2023 with data for the year 2021.

References 

Kuwait
Kuwait
Human Development Index